Karl Oskar Kirmes (born 19 December 1995, Reykjavik, Iceland) is a Finnish male artistic gymnast representing his nation in international competitions. He was born in Reykjavik (Iceland) to Soviet Estonian born-dad and Swedish born-mom. His dad, Mati Kirmes represented the Soviet Union in gymnastics and has also worked as an international coach, while his mother Lina competed for Sweden in the sport. His younger brother Robert represented Finland in gymnastics at the 2019 World Championships in Stuttgart, Germany, and his cousin David Rumbutis competed in the sport at the 2017 European Youth Olympic Festival [EYOF] in Gyor, Hungary. He participated in every edition of the World Championships since his debut in 2013, and qualified for the 2016 Summer Olympics, becoming the first male gymnast from his nation to do so in forty-four years.

References

External links 
 
 
 

1995 births
Living people
Finnish male artistic gymnasts
Oskar Kirmes
People from Espoo
Gymnasts at the 2015 European Games
European Games competitors for Finland
Finnish people of Estonian descent
Finnish people of Swedish descent
Oskar Kirmes
Oskar Kirmes
Gymnasts at the 2016 Summer Olympics
Olympic gymnasts of Finland
Oskar Kirmes
Gymnasts at the 2019 European Games